Aleksandar Simov (born 5 February 1987) is a Serbian football defender who plays for Budućnost Popovac in the Serbian SuperLiga.

References

External links
 
 Aleksandar Simov stats at utakmica.rs

1987 births
Living people
Sportspeople from Niš
Association football defenders
Serbian footballers
FK Radnički Niš players
FK Metalac Gornji Milanovac players
Serbian SuperLiga players
Serbian expatriate footballers
Expatriate footballers in Belgium
Challenger Pro League players
F.C.V. Dender E.H. players